Noah Williams is an American economist and professor of economics at the Miami Herbert Business School at the University of Miami. He previously was a professor of economics at the University of Wisconsin-Madison.

Williams earned his Ph.D. and B.A. in economics from the University of Chicago. He is also an adjunct fellow at the Manhattan Institute.

References

Living people
American economists
University of Chicago alumni
University of Miami faculty
University of Wisconsin–Madison faculty
Year of birth missing (living people)